Ephedra is a genus of gymnosperm shrubs. The various species of Ephedra are widespread in many arid regions of the world, ranging across southwestern North America, southern Europe, northern Africa, southwest and central Asia, northern China and western South America. It is the only extant genus in its family, Ephedraceae, and order, Ephedrales, and one of the three living members of the division Gnetophyta alongside Gnetum and Welwitschia.

In temperate climates, most Ephedra species grow on shores or in sandy soils with direct sun exposure. Common names in English include joint-pine, jointfir, Mormon-tea or Brigham tea. The Chinese name for Ephedra species is mahuang. Ephedra is the origin of the name of the stimulant ephedrine, which the plants contain in significant concentration.

Description
The family Ephedraceae, of which Ephedra is the only extant genus, are gymnosperms, and generally shrubs, sometimes clambering vines, and rarely, small trees. Members of the genus frequently spread by the use of rhizomes.

The stems are green and photosynthetic. The leaves are opposite or whorled. The scalelike leaves fuse into a sheath at the base and this often sheds soon after development. 
There are no resin canals.

The plants are mostly dioecious, with the pollen strobili in whorls of 1–10, each consisting of a series of decussate bracts. The pollen is furrowed. The female strobili also occur in whorls, with bracts which fuse around a single ovule. Fleshy bracts are white (such as in Ephedra frustillata) or red. There are generally 1–2 yellow to dark brown seeds per strobilus.

Taxonomy
The genus Ephedra was first described in 1753 by Carl Linnaeus, and the type species is Ephedra distachya. The family, Ephedraceae, was first described in 1829 by Dumortier.

Evolutionary history 
The oldest known members of the genus are from the Early Cretaceous around 125 million years ago, with records being known from the Aptian-Albian of Argentina, China, Portugal and the United States. The fossil record of Ephedra outside of pollen disappears after the Early Cretaceous. Molecular clock estimates have suggested that last common ancestor of living Ephedra species lived much more recently, during the Early Oligocene around 30 million years ago. However, pollen modified from the ancestral condition of the genus with branched pseudosulci (grooves), which evolved in parallel in the living North American and Asian lineages is known from the Late Cretaceous, suggesting that the last common ancestor is at least this old.

Species 
, Plants of the World Online accepted the following species:
Ephedra alata Decne. – North Africa, Arabian Peninsula
Ephedra altissima Desf. non-Bové (1834), non-Delile (1813), non-Buch (1828) – North Africa, Canary Islands
Ephedra americana Humb. & Bonpl. ex Willd. – Bolivia, Ecuador, Peru, Argentina, Chile 
Ephedra antisyphilitica Berland ex C.A.Mey. – Clapweed, Erect Ephedra – Texas, Oklahoma, New Mexico, Nuevo León, Coahuila, Chihuahua
Ephedra aphylla Forssk. – eastern Mediterranean from Libya and Cyprus to the Persian Gulf
Ephedra × arenicola H.C.Cutler – Arizona, Utah (hybrid, E. cutleri × E. torreyana)
Ephedra aspera Engelm. ex S.Watson – Boundary Ephedra, Pitamoreal – Texas, New Mexico, Arizona, Utah, Nevada, California, Chihuahua, Durango, Zacatecas, Sinaloa, Sonora, Baja California
Ephedra aurantiaca Takht. & Pachom. – Caucasus, Kazakhstan, Turkmenistan
Ephedra boelckei F.A.Roig – Argentina
Ephedra botschantzevii Pachom. – Kazakhstan, Tuva region of Siberia
Ephedra breana Phil. – Peru, Bolivia, Chile, Argentina
Ephedra brevifoliata Ghahr. – Iran
Ephedra californica S.Watson – California Ephedra, California Jointfir – California, western Arizona, Baja California
Ephedra chilensis C.Presl – Pingo-pingo - Chile, Argentina
Ephedra compacta Rose – widespread in much of Mexico
Ephedra coryi E.L.Reed – Cory's Ephedra – Texas, New Mexico
Ephedra cutleri Peebles – Navajo Ephedra, Cutler's Ephedra, Cutler Mormon-tea, Cutler's Jointfir – Colorado, Utah, Arizona, New Mexico, Wyoming
Ephedra dahurica Turcz. – Siberia, Mongolia
Ephedra dawuensis Y.Yang – Sichuan
Ephedra distachya L. – Joint-pine, Jointfir – southern Europe and central Asia from Portugal to Kazakhstan
Ephedra × eleutherolepis V.A.Nikitin – Tajikistan (hybrid E. intermedia × E. strobilacea)
Ephedra equisetina Bunge – Ma huang – Caucasus, Central Asia, Siberia, Mongolia, Gansu, Hebei, Inner Mongolia, Ningxia, Qinghai, Shanxi, Xinjiang
Ephedra fasciculata A.Nelson – Arizona Ephedra, Arizona Jointfir, Desert Mormon-tea – Arizona, California, Nevada, Utah
Ephedra fedtschenkoae Paulsen – Central Asia, Siberia, Mongolia, Xinjiang
Ephedra foeminea Forssk. – North Africa, Somalia, Balkans, Italy, Middle East; naturalized in Santa Barbara County of California
Ephedra foliata Boiss. ex C.A.Mey. – North Africa, Somalia, Middle East, India
Ephedra fragilis Desf. – Mediterranean, Canary Islands, Madeira
Ephedra frustillata Miers – Patagonian Ephedra – Chile, Argentina
Ephedra funerea Coville & C.V.Morton – Death Valley Ephedra, Death Valley Jointfir – California, Arizona, Nevada
Ephedra gerardiana Wall. ex Klotzsch & Garcke – Gerard's Jointfir, Shan Ling Ma Huang – Himalayas, Tibet, Yunnan, Siberia, Central Asia
Ephedra gracilis Phil. ex Stapf
Ephedra holoptera Riedl – Iran
Ephedra intermedia Schrenk & C.A.Mey. – China, Siberia, Central Asia, Himalayas, Iran, Pakistan
Ephedra kardangensis P.Sharma & P.L.Uniyal – western Himalayas
Ephedra khurikensis P.Sharma & P.L.Uniyal – western Himalayas
Ephedra laristanica Assadi – Iran
Ephedra likiangensis Florin – Guizhou, Sichuan, Tibet, Yunnan
Ephedra lomatolepis Schrenk – Kazakhstan, Tuva region of Siberia
Ephedra major Host – Mediterranean, Middle East, Central Asia; from Canary Islands to Kashmir
Ephedra milleri Freitag & Maier-St. – Oman, Yemen
Ephedra minuta Florin – Qinghai, Sichuan
Ephedra monosperma J.G.Gmel. ex C.A.Mey. – Siberia, Mongolia, much of China including Tibet and Xinjiang
Ephedra multiflora Phil. ex Stapf – Chile, Argentina
Ephedra nevadensis S.Watson – Nevada Ephedra, Nevada Jointfir, Nevada Mormon-tea – Baja California, California, Arizona, Nevada, Utah, Oregon
Ephedra ochreata Miers – Argentina
Ephedra oxyphylla Riedl – Afghanistan
Ephedra pachyclada Boiss. – Middle East from Sinai and Yemen to Pakistan
Ephedra pangiensis Rita Singh & P.Sharma
Ephedra pedunculata Engelm. ex S.Watson – Vine Ephedra, Vine Jointfir – Texas, Chihuahua, Coahuila, Durango, San Luis Potosí, Nuevo León, Zacatecas
Ephedra pentandra Pachom. – Iran
Ephedra procera Fisch. & C.A.Mey. − Iran, Caucasus
Ephedra przewalskii Stapf – Central Asia, Mongolia, Pakistan, Gansu, Inner Mongolia, Ningxia, Qinghai, Tibet
Ephedra pseudodistachya Pachom. – Siberia, Mongolia
Ephedra regeliana Florin – Xi Zi Ma Huang – Central Asia, Siberia, Pakistan, Xinjiang
Ephedra rhytidosperma Pachom., syn. E. lepidosperma C.Y.Cheng – Gansu, Inner Mongolia, Ningxia, Mongolia
Ephedra rituensis Y.Yang, D.Z.Fu & G.H.Zhu – Qinghai, Xinjiang, Tibet
Ephedra rupestris Benth. – Ecuador, Peru, Bolivia, Argentina 
Ephedra sarcocarpa Aitch. & Hemsl. – Pakistan, Afghanistan
Ephedra saxatilis (Stapf) Royle ex Florin
Ephedra sinica Stapf – Cao Ma Huang, Chinese ephedra – Mongolia, Siberia, Primorye, Manchuria
Ephedra somalensis Freitag & Maier-St. – Somalia, Eritrea
Ephedra strobilacea Bunge – Iran, Central Asia
Ephedra sumlingensis P.Sharma & P.L.Uniyal – western Himalayas
Ephedra tilhoana Maire – Chad
Ephedra torreyana S.Watson – Torrey's Ephedra, Torrey's Jointfir, Torrey's Mormon-tea, Cañutillo – Nevada, Utah, Colorado, Arizona, New Mexico, Texas, Chihuahua
Ephedra transitoria Riedl – Iraq, Syria, Palestine, Saudi Arabia
Ephedra triandra Tul. − Bolivia, Argentina
Ephedra trifurca Torrey ex S.Watson – Longleaf Ephedra, Longleaf Jointfir, Longleaf Mormon-tea, Popotilla, Teposote – California, Arizona, New Mexico, Texas, Chihuahua, Sonora, Baja California
Ephedra trifurcata Zöllner
Ephedra tweedieana C.A.Mey. – Brazil, Argentina, Uruguay
Ephedra viridis Coville – Green Ephedra, Green Mormon-tea – California, Nevada, Utah, Arizona, New Mexico, Colorado, Wyoming, South Dakota, Oregon
Ephedra vvedenskyi Pachom. – Iran, Caucasus, Turkmenistan
Ephedra yangthangensis Prabha Sharma & Rita Singh – Yangthang to Ka, Leo, Nako, Chango, Chulling, Sumdo, Hoorling and Lira of Kinnaur district of Himachal Pradesh

Distribution
The genus is found worldwide, in desert regions, but not in Australia.

Ecology

Ephedraceae are adapted to extremely arid regions, growing often in high sunny habitats, and occur as high as 4000 m above sea level in both the Andes and the Himalayas. They make up a significant part of the North American Great Basin sage brush ecosystem.

Drug and supplement uses

The Ephedra alkaloids, ephedrine and pseudoephedrine  constituents of E. sinica and other members of the genus  have sympathomimetic and decongestant qualities, and have been used as dietary supplements, mainly for weight loss. The drug, ephedrine, is used to prevent low blood pressure during spinal anesthesia.

In the United States, ephedra supplements were banned from the market in the early 21st century due to serious safety risks. Plants of the genus Ephedra, including E. sinica and others, were used in traditional medicine for treating headache and respiratory infections, but there is no scientific evidence they are effective or safe for these purposes.

Ephedra has also had a role as a precursor in the clandestine manufacture of methamphetamine.

Adverse effects
Alkaloids obtained from the species of Ephedra used in herbal medicines, which are used to synthetically prepare pseudoephedrine and ephedrine, can cause cardiovascular events. These events have been associated with arrhythmias, palpitations, tachycardia and myocardial infarction. Caffeine consumption in combination with ephedrine has been reported to increase the risk of these cardiovascular events.

Economic botany and alkaloid content
The earliest uses of Ephedra species (mahuang) for specific illnesses date back to 5000 BC. Ephedrine and its isomers were isolated in 1881 from Ephedra distachya and characterized by the Japanese organic chemist Nagai Nagayoshi. His work to access Ephedra's active ingredients to isolate a pure pharmaceutical substance led to the systematic production of semi-synthetic derivatives thereof is relevant still today. Three species, Ephedra sinica, Ephedra vulgaris, and to a lesser extent Ephedra equisetina, are commercially grown in Mainland China as a source for natural ephedrines and isomers for use in pharmaceuticals. E. sinica and E. vulgaris usually carry six optically active phenylethylamines, mostly ephedrine and pseudoephedrine with minor amounts of norephedrine, norpseudoephedrine as well as the three methylated analogs. Reliable information on the total alkaloid content of the crude drug is difficult to obtain. Based on HPLC analyses in industrial settings, the concentrations of total alkaloids in dried Herba Ephedra ranged between 1 and 4%, and in some cases up to 6%.

For a review of the alkaloid distribution in different species of the genus Ephedra see Jian-fang Cui (1991). Other American and European species of Ephedra, e.g. Ephedra nevadensis (Nevada Mormon tea) have not been systematically assayed; based on unpublished field investigations, they contain very low levels (less than 0.1%) or none at all.

See also 
 Haoma

References

External links 

Ephedra viridis (Plants for a Future Database)
Usage in Chinese Medicine 
Ephedra fact sheet, NIH National Center for Complementary and Integrative Health
Ephedrea (Evidence and dosing) , Mayo Clinic
Ephedra – Clinical summary and mechanism of action, MSKCC Memorial Sloan Kettering Cancer Center
Ephedraceae of Mongolia in FloraGREIF

Gymnosperm genera
 
Medicinal plants
Soma (drink)
Plants used in traditional Chinese medicine
Aptian genus first appearances
Extant Aptian first appearances